Vardhan is a surname. Notable people with the surname include: 

Harsh Vardhan (Delhi politician) 
Harsh Vardhan (Uttar Pradesh politician)
Harsha Vardhan, Indian actor
Kirti Vardhan Singh (born 1966), Indian politician
Ranjay Vardhan (born 1969), Indian sociologist
Vishnu Vardhan (born 1987), Indian tennis player
Vishnuvardhan (actor) (Karnataka), Indian actor